is a Japanese professional wrestler currently working for the Japanese promotion World Wonder Ring Stardom.

Professional wrestling career

World Wonder Ring Stardom (2017–present) 
Rina made her professional wrestling debut at the early age of 11 in World Wonder Ring Stardom, on the second night of the Stardom Shining Stars from June 11, 2017, where she teamed up with her twin sister Hina and fell short to Hanan in a 2-on-1 exhibition handicap match.

At Stardom Yokohama Cinderella 2020 on October 3, 2020, Rina had to search for a new unit since Tokyo Cyber Squad disbanded after Oedo Tai's Natsuko Tora and Saki Kashima defeated Jungle Kyona and Konami in a Losing unit must disband match. She alongside Kyona, Ruaka and Death Yama-san received invitations for joining the Stars stable leaded by Mayu Iwatani which they accepted. Three weeks later however, on October 28, 2020, Rina would quit Stars to join Oedo Tai.

At Stardom Yokohama Dream Cinderella 2021 on April 4, Rina teamed up with Natsuko Tora, Ruaka, Konami and Saki Kashima to defeat Stars (Mayu Iwatani, Saya Iida, Starlight Kid, Hanan and Gokigen Death) in a Ten-woman elimination tag team match where the last one eliminated was forced to join the enemy unit and since Gokigen Death was eliminated last, she was forced to join Oedo Tai. On the first night of the Stardom Cinderella Tournament 2021 from April 10, Rina replaced Saki Kashima in a first-round tournament match where she defeated AZM. She did not compete further in the tournament. On the third night of the event from June 12, she defeated Hina and Lady C in a three-way match. At Yokohama Dream Cinderella 2021 in Summer on July 4, Rina teamed up with Saki Kashima and participated in a Gauntlet tag team match won by Konami and Fukigen Death and also involving Maika and Lady C, and Hanan and Hina. Rina competed in almost all of the Stardom 5 Star Grand Prix 2021 nights but without taking part into the proper tournament. She began with the very first night from July 31, 2021 where she teamed up with Saki Kashima, Konami and Ruaka to defeat Queen's Quest (AZM and Hina), Hanan and Lady C.  On the last night of the event which occurred on September 25, 2021, she fell short to Hanan and Momo Watanabe. At Stardom 10th Anniversary Grand Final Osaka Dream Cinderella on October 9, 2021, Rina teamed up with Saki Kashima to defeat Lady C and Waka Tsukiyama. At the 2021 edition of the Goddesses of Stardom Tag League, Rina teamed up with Hanan as "Water & Oil" and competed in the Red Goddess Block where they scored a total of two points after going against the teams of FWC (Hazuki and Koguma), AphrOditE (Utami Hayashishita and Saya Kamitani), Himepoi '21 (Himeka and Natsupoi), Cosmic Angels (Unagi Sayaka and Mai Sakurai), and another sub-unit of Oedo Tai, I love HigashiSpo! made of Saki Kashima and Fukigen Death. At Kawasaki Super Wars, the first event of the Stardom Super Wars trilogy which took place on November 3, 2021, Rina teamed up with Hanan to wrestle in one of the tag league matches which cross-evented The Wars where they fell short to Saki Kashima and Fukigen Death. At Tokyo Super Wars on November 27, Rina teamed up with Kashima and Death to fall short to Mayu Iwatani, Hazuki and Hanan. At Stardom Dream Queendom on December 29, 2021, Rina competed in a five-way match won by Fukigen Death and also involving Lady C, Waka Tsukiyama and Saki Kashima. 

On January 29, 2022 at Stardom Nagoya Supreme Fight, Rina competed in another five-way match this time involving three of her Oedo Tai stablemates, Ruaka, Saki Kashima and Fukigen Death, and the outnumbered winner Momo Kohgo. At Stardom Cinderella Journey on February 23, 2022, Rina fell short to mai Sakurai and Waka Tsukiyama in a number one contender's match for the Future of Stardom Championship. On the first night of the Stardom World Climax 2022 from March 26, Rina unsuccessfully challenged Hanan for the Future of Stardom Championship. On the second night from March 27, she competed in a 18-women Cinderella Rumble match won by Mei Suruga and also involving various superstars who competed at the Stardom New Blood 1 rookie event from March 11, 2022 such as Tomoka Inaba, Aoi, Haruka Umesaki, Nanami, Maria and others. Rina took part in the Stardom Cinderella Tournament 2022, falling short to Saya Iida in the first-rounds from April 3, 2022.

Personal life
Rina's real life twin sister Hina is also a professional wrestler. So is Hanan who is their older sister. They all compete in Stardom.

Championships and accomplishments 
 World Wonder Ring Stardom
 Stardom Year-End Award (1 time)
 Best Unit Award (2021)

References

2006 births
21st-century Japanese women
Japanese female professional wrestlers
Japanese twins
Living people
People from Shimotsuke, Tochigi
Sportspeople from Tochigi Prefecture
Twin sportspeople